Kevin Kratz (born 21 January 1987) is a German professional football manager and former player who is the current technical director and head coach of MLS Next club Atlanta United U-16.

Playing career

Europe
After spending three seasons with Bayer 04 Leverkusen's reserve team early in his career, Kratz joined Alemannia Aachen in the 2. Bundesliga. After Aachen was relegated from the 2. Bundesliga at the end of the 2011–12 season, he transferred to Eintracht Braunschweig. With his new club, Kratz won promotion to the Bundesliga in 2013. After the 2013–14 Bundesliga season, Kratz transferred to SV Sandhausen.

Philadelphia Union
In September 2016, Kratz signed with Philadelphia Union of Major League Soccer in the United States. Union Sporting Director Earnie Stewart indicated that Kratz would find a place in the Union midfield, stating "Kevin provides us valuable depth in multiple positions across our midfield."  Union coach Jim Curtin likewise indicated that Kratz would fit into a central position in the midfield but suggested that he would be used as a backup for existing Union players. Philadelphia later announced that Kratz would not be returning to the team for the 2017 season.

Atlanta United FC

On 11 December 2016, Philadelphia announced that it had completed its transaction to send midfielder Kratz to Atlanta United, acquiring the expansion club’s fourth-round pick in the 2020 MLS SuperDraft in exchange for Kratz.

After scoring on two free kicks, one being the game-winning goal, against Montreal Impact on 28 April 2018, Kratz won both MLS Goal of the Week honors and MLS Team of the Week bench honors for Week 9 of the 2018 season.

Managerial career

Atlanta United Academy
In circa February 2019, Kratz re-joined Atlanta United as a talent scout and was the acting Head of Football Operations and Transfers at a point, and helped during the 2019 MLS SuperDraft with player selection.
In March 2020, Kratz was appointed as the new manager for Atlanta United's Under-16 program due to COVID-19 furloughs. Kratz is praised by his club's front office and is touted by This Week in MLS as one of the "Top 10 Youth Managers for MLS Clubs".

Personal life
Kratz earned his U.S. green card in July 2017. This status also qualifies him as a domestic player for MLS roster purposes.

Career statistics

References

External links
 
 Kevin Kratz at Alemannia Aachen's official Website 

1987 births
Living people
People from Eschweiler
Sportspeople from Cologne (region)
German footballers
Footballers from North Rhine-Westphalia
Association football midfielders
Bayer 04 Leverkusen II players
Alemannia Aachen players
Eintracht Braunschweig players
SV Sandhausen players
Philadelphia Union players
Atlanta United FC players
Atlanta United 2 players
Bundesliga players
2. Bundesliga players
Major League Soccer players
USL Championship players
German expatriate footballers
German expatriate sportspeople in the United States
Expatriate soccer players in the United States